Alfred Hagn (18 February 1948, in Fischbachau – 11 April 2020) was a German alpine skier who competed in the 1968 Winter Olympics and 1972 Winter Olympics. He died 11 April 2020.

References

External links
 sports-reference.com

1948 births
2020 deaths
German male alpine skiers
Olympic alpine skiers of West Germany
Alpine skiers at the 1968 Winter Olympics
Alpine skiers at the 1972 Winter Olympics
20th-century German people